Muévete is the second album by Spanish singer Melody. She released it in 2002, at the age of 11.

The album debuted at number 38 in Spain for the week of 10 June 2002, peaking at number 27. The album sold 50,000 copies, which was a sharp decline from De pata negras 500,000.

Track listing

Charts

References

External links 
 

2002 albums
Melody (Spanish singer) albums
Epic Records albums